"Scandalous" is a song by British girl group Mis-Teeq. It was composed by band members Su-Elise Nash, Alesha Dixon, and Sabrina Washington along with frequent collaborators Hallgeir Rustan, Tor Erik Hermansen, and Mikkel Eriksen for their second studio album, Eye Candy (2003), with production handled by the latter two under their production moniker StarGate. Written in the key of C minor, "Scandalous" is an up-tempo R&B song with a heavy bassline, strings, a siren sound, and suggestive lyrics.

The song became a hit throughout Europe and Oceania, reaching the top 10 in Australia, Denmark, Ireland, New Zealand, and the United Kingdom. "Scandalous" has sold 195,000 copies in the UK, becoming the group's biggest-selling single. In 2004, "Scandalous" was chosen as Mis-Teeq's second single in the United States, where it reached number 35 on the Billboard Hot 100, number two on the Billboard Dance Singles Sales chart, and number 11 on the Billboard Mainstream Top 40.

A mashup of "Scandalous" with the Redman & Adam F song "Smash Sumthin'" was performed live at the 2003 MOBO Awards, where the song was nominated for two awards, including 'Best Video'. The mashup, titled "Sumthin' Scandalous", appears on the limited edition of "Eye Candy".

Music video
The music video was directed by Jake Nava. It starts at night, where a lone man is seen running through an urban, inner city area, and disabling CCTV cameras, with a vicious dog on a leash barking at him. The man then runs into an unused warehouse, the location of a secret nightclub where Mis-Teeq are seen. Street dance and breakdancing is predominantly seen throughout the rest of the video. The audio for the music video starts out as the radio version for most of the song, before transitioning to the Jazzwad remix from the middle of the bridge onwards.

Track listings

 UK CD single
 "Scandalous" (radio mix) – 4:02
 "Scandalous" (Oracle remix) – 4:59
 "Scandalous" (Jazzwad remix) – 4:41
 "Scandalous" (Blacksmith radio remix) – 3:48
 "Scandalous" (video)

 UK cassette single and European CD single
 "Scandalous" (radio mix) – 4:02
 "Scandalous" (Oracle remix) – 4:59

 Australian CD single
 "Scandalous" (radio mix) – 4:00
 "Scandalous" (Oracle remix) – 4:57
 "Scandalous" (Jazzwad remix) – 4:40
 "Scandalous" (Blacksmith radio remix) – 3:48

 US CD single
 "Scandalous" (single version) – 3:58
 "Scandalous" (Blacksmith radio remix) – 3:48

 US maxi-CD single
 "Scandalous" (single version) – 3:58
 "Scandalous" (Blacksmith remix) – 5:03
 "Scandalous" (Jazzwad remix) – 4:47
 "Scandalous" (Rudeness vocal remix) – 6:21
 "Scandalous" (Bermudez & Griffin Stained Blue Dress mix) – 7:52

Credits and personnel
Credits are taken from the Eye Candy album booklet.

Studios
 Recorded and mixed at StarGate Studios (Norway)
 Mastered at Metropolis Mastering (London, England)

Personnel
 StarGate – production
 Mikkel S. Eriksen – writing, all instruments
 Hallgeir Rustan – writing, all instruments
 Tor Erik Hermansen – writing, all instruments
 Mis-Teeq – all vocals
 Alesha Dixon – writing
 Sabrina Washington – writing
 Su-Elise Nash – writing
 Miles Showell – mastering

Charts

Weekly charts

Year-end charts

Certifications

Release history

In popular culture
Mis-Teeq promoted the song by appearing in Coca-Cola television commercials aired in 2003 to coincide with the song's release, resulting in extra publicity. The song was then featured in promotions for the 2004 film Catwoman. Originally, the film's theme song was to be Britney Spears' "Outrageous", but Spears broke her knee on the set of the music video and the idea was scrapped. This resulted in "Scandalous" becoming the theme song.

References

2003 songs
2003 singles
Mis-Teeq songs
Music videos directed by Jake Nava
Reprise Records singles
Song recordings produced by Stargate (record producers)
Songs written by Alesha Dixon
Songs written by Hallgeir Rustan
Songs written by Mikkel Storleer Eriksen
Songs written by Sabrina Washington
Songs written by Su-Elise Nash
Songs written by Tor Erik Hermansen
Telstar Records singles